= Allied occupation =

Allied occupation may refer to:

- Allied-occupied Austria
- Allied-occupied Germany
- Occupation of Japan
